F-Letter is the third studio album by post-hardcore band Frodus, originally released in 1996 through Double Duece NYC. To fund the recording for the album, Shelby Cinca sold a virtual reality helmet at a Doom tournament held by a now-defunct computer store. The album has been reissued many times on both CD and vinyl formats through a variety of record labels.

Track listing

Personnel

Performers
Shelby Cinca - Vocals, guitar, percussion on "Factory Six"
Jason Hamacher - Drums, percussion on "Factory Six"
Howard Pyle - Bass, vocals
Brian McTernan - Screams and cymbals on "Buick Commission", percussion on "Factory Six"

Artwork
Will Weems - Artwork, photography, layout (original 1996 version)
Chapplle Conant - Photography (original 1996 version)
Prof. Yaya - Design, art direction (2003 version)
David S. Holloway - Photography (2003 version)
Shelby Cinca - Layout (2013 version)

Production
Brian McTernan - Recording
Howard Pyle - Mixing (original 1996 version)
Chad Clark - Mixing (2003 reissue)

Release history

References

External links

1996 albums
Frodus albums
Albums produced by Brian McTernan